Fort George (also sometimes known as Fort Majabigwaduce, Castine, or Penobscot) was a palisaded earthwork fort built in 1779 by Great Britain during the American Revolutionary War in Castine, Maine.  Located at a high point on the Bagaduce Peninsula, the fort was built as part of an initiative by the British to establish a new colony called New Ireland.  It was the principal site of the British defense during the Massachusetts-organized Penobscot Expedition, a disastrous attempt in July and August of 1779 to retake Castine in response to the British move.  The British re-occupied Castine in the War of 1812 from September 1814 to April 1815, rebuilding Fort George and establishing smaller forts around it, again creating the New Ireland colony. The remains of the fort, now little more than its earthworks, are part of a state-owned and town-maintained park.

Description and history
Features of the fort that have not survived include a palisade, moat, and gateway. The fort is one of a series of defenses erected by the British in 1779, which notably included the digging of a canal across much of the neck separating the Bagaduce Peninsula from the rest of the mainland.

Castine is set at a strategically significant location near the head of Penobscot Bay, and was a point of conflict at several times between the 17th and 19th centuries.  Pursuant to plans for establishing a military presence on the coast of Maine as well as the colony of New Ireland, a British force led by General Francis McLean arrived off Castine in June 1779, seized the town, and established Fort George and other fortifications in the area.  The state of Massachusetts, of which Maine was then a part, responded by raising a large militia force, which in an operation known as the Penobscot Expedition, disastrously failed in its attempt to dislodge the British in July and August of 1779.

The British established the fort under the command of a general named Campbell.  There were about 30 houses in the area.  They brought in prizes (captured ships and cargo) there, and received trade from British-controlled Halifax and New York. Loyalists from the surrounding area flocked to the village. A Loyalist guide for a party traveling from Falmouth (now Portland) to Fort George returned to his home in Camden afterwards and was later captured, court-martialed and executed by the Americans, tried by Major Benjamin Burton under the direction of Brigadier General Peleg Wadsworth. In revenge for this, a party of 25 Loyalists eventually went to Wadsworth's quarters and took him prisoner, also capturing Major Burton; they were incarcerated at Fort George. Wadsworth and Burton escaped on June 15, 1781 by cutting a hole in the roof of their jail.

The fort was not abandoned by the British until 1784, and was not re-used by the United States until after the War of 1812.

The British re-occupied Castine in the War of 1812 from September 1814 to April 1815, again establishing New Ireland. They rebuilt Fort George, renamed the captured Fort Madison (aka Fort United States) as Fort Castine, and built Forts Furieuse, Gosselin, Griffith, and Sherbrooke. They also refurbished the peninsula's canal defense line. They withdrew after the cessation of hostilities, and following a brief period of American use, the fort was abandoned and demolished in 1819.

The state of Maine acquired the fort in 1940, and twenty years later provided funds to rebuild a magazine with other improvements. The site was listed on the National Register of Historic Places in 1969. Fort George is the site of Majabigwaduce, the location for Bernard Cornwell's 2010 book The Fort, which is about the Penobscot Expedition.

Gallery

See also

Defence (1779 brigantine)
Military history of Nova Scotia
History of Maine
National Register of Historic Places listings in Hancock County, Maine

References 

 Fort George - National Park Service

Bibliography 
  A historical novel depicting the Penobscot Expedition, with a non-fiction "Historical Note" (pp. 451–468) on sources and key details.
 Smith, Joshua M. Making Maine: Statehood and the War of 1812 Amherst, MA: the University of Massachusetts Press, 2022.

External links 
 Fort George (Castine) at FortWiki.com
 Forts of Castine at NorthAmericanForts.com

George
George (Castine)
George (Castine)
Military history of New England
Military history of Nova Scotia
History of Maine
History of New England
Castine, Maine
George
Protected areas of Hancock County, Maine
National Register of Historic Places in Hancock County, Maine
Conflict sites on the National Register of Historic Places in Maine
American Revolution on the National Register of Historic Places
George (Castine)
Demolished buildings and structures in Maine
Buildings and structures demolished in 1819